5285 Krethon  is a Jupiter trojan from the Greek camp, approximately  in diameter. It was discovered on 9 March 1989, by American astronomer couple Carolyn and Eugene Shoemaker at the Palomar Observatory in California. The dark Jovian asteroid belongs the 100 largest Jupiter trojans and has a rotation period of 12.0 hours. It was named from Greek mythology, after the warrior Crethon (Krethon), twin-brother of Orsilochus.

Orbit and classification 

Krethon is a dark Jovian asteroid in a 1:1 orbital resonance with Jupiter. It is located in the leading Greek camp at the Gas Giant's  Lagrangian point, 60° ahead of its orbit . It is also a non-family asteroid in the Jovian background population. It orbits the Sun at a distance of 4.9–5.4 AU once every 11 years and 9 months (4,299 days; semi-major axis of 5.17 AU). Its orbit has an eccentricity of 0.05 and an inclination of 25° with respect to the ecliptic. The body's observation arc begins with a precovery taken at Palomar in March 1956, or 33 years prior to its official discovery observation.

Physical characteristics 

Krethon is an assumed, carbonaceous C-type asteroid, while most larger Jupiter trojans are D-types. It has a high V–I color index of 1.09 (see table below).

Rotation period 

In March 2013 and June 2015, two rotational lightcurves of Krethon were obtained from photometric observations by Robert Stephens at the Center for Solar System Studies in Landers, California. Lightcurve analysis gave an identical rotation period of 12.04 hours with a brightness amplitude between 0.33 and 0.46 magnitude. This supersedes a previous, poorly-rated period determination of 20.88 hours.

Diameter and albedo 

According to the surveys carried out by the Infrared Astronomical Satellite IRAS, the Japanese Akari satellite, and the NEOWISE mission of NASA's Wide-field Infrared Survey Explorer, Krethon measures between 49.606 and 58.53 kilometers in diameter and its surface has an albedo between 0.062 and 0.079. The Collaborative Asteroid Lightcurve Link assumes a standard albedo for a carbonaceous asteroid of 0.057 and calculates a diameter of 53.16 kilometers based on an absolute magnitude of 10.1.

Naming 

This minor planet was named after the Greek warrior Crethon (Krethon), son of Diocles and twin brother of Orsilochus (also see 5284 Orsilocus), who were fighting under Agamemnon and Menelaus in the Trojan War. Both were slain by Aeneas. The official naming citation was published by the Minor Planet Center on 12 July 1995.

Notes

References

External links 
 Asteroid Lightcurve Database (LCDB), query form (info )
 Dictionary of Minor Planet Names, Google books
 Discovery Circumstances: Numbered Minor Planets (5001)-(10000) – Minor Planet Center
 
 

005285
Discoveries by Carolyn S. Shoemaker
Discoveries by Eugene Merle Shoemaker
Named minor planets
19890309